Niall Forbes Ross Dickson CBE (born 5 November 1953) was appointed chair of East Kent Hospitals University Foundation Trust in April 2021. He was chief executive of the NHS Confederation, between February 2017. and October 2020.

Between 2010 and 2016 he served as chief executive and registrar of the General Medical Council (GMC), and led the International Association of Medical Regulatory Authorities (IAMRA) until 2016. Previously, Dickson worked as chief executive of the King’s Fund, from 2004 to 2009, after a career in journalism.

Early life
He was born in Scotland and educated at Glasgow Academy, Edinburgh Academy and then studied at the University of Edinburgh. He is the brother of Alastair Dickson, founder of the Scottish law firm Dickson Minto.

Career

Journalism
He was the editor of the Nursing Times from 1983 to 1988.

He worked at the BBC for 15 years, joining as health correspondent in 1988 and progressing to the position of social affairs editor for BBC News from 1995 to 2003. As social affairs editor he was responsible for around 80 journalists and his producer was Laura Kuenssberg.

Management
He was Chief Executive of the King's Fund from 2004 to 2009.

In January 2010, he was appointed as Chief Executive and registrar of the General Medical Council. He took up the post of chair of the IAMRA in 2014, for a three-year term of office.

Dickson was appointed Commander of the Order of the British Empire (CBE) in the 2017 Birthday Honours for services to patient safety.

References

British chief executives
Living people
Medical journalists
BBC newsreaders and journalists
People educated at the Glasgow Academy
People educated at Edinburgh Academy
Alumni of the University of Edinburgh
Commanders of the Order of the British Empire
1953 births